Utopia is a British conspiracy thriller television series broadcast on the UK TV station Channel 4. Two series were produced, consisting of six episodes each.

Series overview

Episodes

Series 1 (2013)

Series 2 (2014)
A second six-part series of Utopia was commissioned by Channel 4, going into production in late 2013. Kudos Film and Television announced that series 2 would air in July 2014, which it did.

References

External links

 Utopia at Kudos Film and Television
 

Lists of British drama television series episodes